Aleksi Benashvili (born 20 March 1989) is a Georgian professional football player. Currently, he plays for FC Shevardeni-1906 Tbilisi.

External links
 

1989 births
Living people
Footballers from Georgia (country)
Footballers from Tbilisi
Georgia (country) international footballers
FC Zestafoni players
FC Merani Martvili players
FC Torpedo Kutaisi players
Association football midfielders